Castlerahan is a barony in County Cavan, Republic of Ireland. Baronies were mainly cadastral rather than administrative units. They acquired modest local taxation and spending functions in the 19th century before being superseded by the Local Government (Ireland) Act 1898.

Etymology
The name is derived from Irish Caisleán Raithín, "stone fort of the little ringfort," although other writers link it with raithean, "bracken", or with a Norse Gael leader named Raithin.

Geography

Castlerahan is located in the southeast of County Cavan, the area surrounding Lough Ramor.

History

The Luigni tribe lived in the area since the 8th century. It contains the parish of Munterconnaught, named for Cu Connaght Ua Raghallaigh (O'Reilly). The barony of Castlerahan was created by 1609 in the Plantation of Ulster, and was archaically spelled Castlerachan.

The barony gives its name to Castlerahan GAA, based in Ballyjamesduff.

List of settlements

Below is a list of settlements in Castlerahan:

Ballyjamesduff
Crosserlough
Kilnaleck
Mullagh
Virginia

References

Baronies of County Cavan